Pandharinath Sitaramji Patil (1903–1978) was an Indian social reformer, politician, and activist of the non-Brahmin movement.  He was one of the earliest biographer of Jotirao Phule.

Early life
Patil was born to Radhabai and Sitaram Raut on 20 September 1903 at Amboda in Buldana district of Bombay Presidency (now in Maharashtra).  He had his primary education in Marathi in vernacular schools at Pimpri Adhao and Chandur Biswa.  According to traditions of those days, he was married at a young age of nine with Saraswati (née Junare) in 1912.

He further had his English education at Pimpalgaon Kale during the years 1917–1919.

Social work
Patil was an active member of non-Brahmin movement in the Buldhana district and was greatly inspired by the work of Jyotirao Phule.  He started many schools at various places in the district like Jambhuldhaba, Kinhola, Deulgaon Mahi, Mera, Chandol, etc.  He also founded a hostel named after Chokhamela. He successfully arranged a session of Satyashodhak Samaj at Amravati in 1925.

Political career
Patil started his political career along with his work in non-Brahman movement.  Following the Government of India Act 1935, when elections were held in 1937, he ran the elections as a candidate of non-Brahmin party and won the election against a candidate of Indian National Congress (Congress).  He joined the Congress around the Quit India movement of 1942.  He was a member of Central Provinces and Berar assembly from 1937 to 1952.

After Independence of India, Patil was mostly involved in work in education and agriculture sector.  He also took part in United Maharashtra Movement in the 1950s.

Patil was elected to the upper house of Parliament of India, Rajya Sabha, in 1962 and was a member for two terms till 1974.

He died on 2 October 1978.

References

1903 births
1978 deaths
Satyashodhak Samaj
Indian National Congress politicians from Maharashtra
People from Buldhana district
Rajya Sabha members from Maharashtra